Jim Williams (born 1947) is the name of the British lawyer, commercial consultant and writer, who has also written under the pen names Richard Hugo (not to be confused with an American author of the same name) and Alexander Mollin.

Born and brought up in Oldham, Lancashire, England, Williams graduated with a BA Hons in Law and Sociology at Durham University, was called to the bar in 1970. He practised law for a number of years before changing to a career of legal and commercial work in the construction industry. He is married with three children.

His work as an author falls under four categories:
 Crime Stories as Jim Williams
 Thrillers
 Murder Mystery
 A Historical Romance as Jim Williams
 A Science Fantasy as Jim Williams
 Non-fiction as Jim Williams
 A Historical Romance as Alexander Mollin
 Thrillers as Richard Hugo

Writing career

Williams came to public attention when his first novel, The Hitler Diaries, was published nine months before the famous Hitler Diaries forgery scandal, and he seemed again prophetic when Farewell to Russia, a novel about a nuclear accident in the USSR, was completed four months before the Chernobyl Disaster. Lara's Child was the subject of an international literary scandal in 1994 because its subject was a sequel to Doctor Zhivago.

Scherzo was nominated for the Booker Prize. Frances Fyfield called it "Sparkling and utterly charming". How to be a Charlatan is winner of the IAC Prize and was commended by Nick Webb (author of A Dictionary of Bullshit) as "Appalling and immoral. How wonderful!"

Jim Williams' books have received positive reviews in The Times Literary Supplement, The Guardian and The Evening Standard.

Jim Williams has been translated into six languages.

Bibliography

Jim Williams - Novels

Thrillers

Murder Mystery

 (Nominated for the Booker Prize)

Historical Romance

Science Fantasy

Jim Williams - Non-fiction
 (Winner of the IAC Prize)

Alexander Mollin - Novels

Richard Hugo - Novels

References

External links
Official website of Jim Williams

1947 births
Living people
People from Oldham
20th-century English novelists
21st-century English novelists
Members of the Bar of England and Wales
English crime fiction writers
English thriller writers
English non-fiction writers
English autobiographers
English male novelists
Writers of historical romances
20th-century English male writers
21st-century English male writers
English male non-fiction writers
Alumni of University College, Durham